Jere E. Goyan (August 3, 1930 – January 17, 2007) was an American pharmacist who served as Commissioner of Food and Drugs from 1979 to 1981.

He died on January 17, 2007, in Houston, Texas at age 76.

References

1930 births
2007 deaths
American pharmacists
Commissioners of the Food and Drug Administration
Carter administration personnel
Members of the National Academy of Medicine